The Ring or Ring Road languages, spoken in the Western Grassfields of Cameroon, form a branch of the Narrow Grassfields languages. The best-known Ring language is Kom.

The family is named after the old Ring Road of central Cameroon.

Languages
Centre: Babanki, Mmen, Kom, Mbessa, Bum, Kung, Kuk, Oku
East: Nso (Lamnso')
South: Vengo, Wushi, Bamunka, Kenswei Nsei
West: Aghem, Isu, Laimbue, Weh, Zhoa

See also
List of Proto-Ring reconstructions (Wiktionary)

References

External links
Ethnographic information on the Bum people 

 
Grassfields Bantu languages